Michael Culkin (born 2 July 1954) is an English theatre, film, and television actor probably best known for his role as Judge Buller in the BBC drama Garrow's Law. He appeared as Rab Butler in the first two seasons of The Crown, in The Iron Lady with Meryl Streep, opposite Johnny Depp in Mortdecai and with Hugh Grant in A Very English Scandal playing the Conservative politician Reginald Maudling. He appeared in two seasons of Poldark as Horace Treneglos and will return in the fourth season. He has extensive BBC and ITV Television credits as well as work at the National Theatre and in the West End where he starred with Maggie Smith in Alan Bennett's The Lady in the Van. He is unmarried and lives in Thaxted, Essex, London and Norfolk with several dogs and a llama. He is a member of the British Academy of Film and Television Arts.

Selected filmography

External links

English male stage actors
English male film actors
English male television actors
Living people
20th-century English male actors
21st-century English male actors
1954 births
English male voice actors
English male video game actors